Flippin' Out is an album by Gigolo Aunts released in October 1993 on Fire Records in the UK and April 1994 on RCA/BMG in the US.  It includes the track "Where I Find My Heaven", featured on the soundtrack to 1994 comedy film, Dumb and Dumber, which helped to break the band into the charts. The song "Lemon Peeler" was featured in the 1995 movie Born to be wild. The US and UK versions feature different track listings.  The title track, "Flippin' Out", was originally recorded by the Wizards, a NY/NJ supergroup circa 1988/1989, part of a six song EP that was never released.  In a story attributed to Phil Marino, known for his work photographing the band, the Gigolo Aunts became acquainted with the song through Rob Norris, the producer of their debut album, Everybody Happy.  Norris, a former member of the Bongos and at the time a current member of the Wizards, reportedly sent a tape of the six song EP to the Gigolo Aunts, who recorded "Flippin' Out" as the title track for the album.  The album cover features Chloë Sevigny.

Track listing
UK Version (Fire Records) Catalog Number: FIRECD35 (1993) Format: CD
UK Version (Fire Records) Catalog Number: FIRELP35 (1993) Format: LP

"Cope"  (Brouwer, Gibbs, Hurley, Hurley) 3:49
"Where I Find My Heaven"  (Brouwer, Gibbs, Hurley, Hurley) 3:23
"Lullaby" (Brouwer, Gibbs, Hurley, Hurley) 5:06
"Easy Reader" (Brouwer, Gibbs, Hurley, Hurley) 3:55
"Figurine"  (Brouwer, Gibbs, Hurley, Hurley) 5:01
"Mrs. Washington" (Brouwer, Gibbs, Hurley, Hurley) 4:48
"Bloom"  (Brouwer, Gibbs, Hurley, Hurley) 4:01
"Gun" (Brouwer, Gibbs, Hurley, Hurley) 4:38
"Pin Cushion" (Brouwer, Gibbs, Hurley, Hurley) 4:41
"Flippin' Out" (Vincent Casey) 6:10

US Version (RCA/BMG) Catalog Number: 07863 66392-2 (1994) Format: CD
US Version (RCA/BMG) Catalog Number: RMJ 66392-2 (1994) Format: CD [Promo]

"Cope"  (Brouwer, Gibbs, Hurley, Hurley)  3:47
"Lemon Peeler"  (Brouwer, Gibbs, Hurley, Hurley)  3:28
"Ride On, Baby, Ride On"  (Brouwer, Gibbs, Hurley, Hurley)  5:15
"Bloom"  (Brouwer, Gibbs, Hurley, Hurley)  4:00
"Figurine"  (Brouwer, Gibbs, Hurley, Hurley)  5:03
"Where I Find My Heaven"  (Brouwer, Gibbs, Hurley, Hurley)  3:23
"Lullaby" (Brouwer, Gibbs, Hurley, Hurley)  5:07
"Mrs. Washington" (Brouwer, Gibbs, Hurley, Hurley)  4:46
"Gun" (Brouwer, Gibbs, Hurley, Hurley)  4:38
"Pin Cushion" (Brouwer, Gibbs, Hurley, Hurley)  4:43
"Flippin' Out" (Vincent Casey)  6:10

References

1993 albums
1994 albums
Gigolo Aunts albums
RCA Records albums
Fire Records (UK) albums
Albums produced by Paul Q. Kolderie